Samuel Estill Whitaker (September 25, 1886 – March 26, 1967) was a Tennessee attorney and later a judge of the  United States Court of Claims.

Education and career

Born on September 25, 1886, in Winchester, Tennessee, Whitaker received a Bachelor of Laws from the University of Chattanooga (now the University of Tennessee at Chattanooga) in 1909. He was in private practice in Chattanooga, Tennessee from 1909 to 1914, when he joined the United States Army at the outset of World War I. He served as a captain in Field Artillery until 1919. He was an attorney for the Bureau of Internal Revenue (now the Internal Revenue Service) from 1919 to 1920. He returned to private practice in Chattanooga from 1921 to 1937. He was city attorney of Chattanooga from 1923 to 1924. He was the Mayor of Riverview, Tennessee from 1925 to 1929. He was a special assistant to the Attorney General of the United States in the United States Department of Justice from 1933 to 1937. He was an assistant attorney general for the Civil Division of the United States Department of Justice in 1939.

Federal judicial service

Whitaker was nominated by President Franklin D. Roosevelt on June 23, 1939, to a Judge seat on the Court of Claims (United States Court of Claims from June 25, 1948) vacated by Judge Richard S. Whaley. He was confirmed by the United States Senate on July 11, 1939, and his received commission on July 13, 1939. Whitaker was initially appointed as a Judge under Article I, but the court was raised to Article III status by operation of law on July 28, 1953, and Whitaker thereafter served as an Article III Judge. He assumed senior status on July 19, 1964. His service terminated on March 26, 1967, due to his death in Washington, D.C.

Note

References

Sources
 

1886 births
1967 deaths
Judges of the United States Court of Claims
United States Article I federal judges appointed by Franklin D. Roosevelt
20th-century American judges